The 1913 New York Giants season was the franchise's 31st season.  It involved the Giants winning the National League pennant for the third consecutive year. Led by manager John McGraw, the Giants dominated the NL and finished 12½ games in front of the second place Philadelphia Phillies. They were beaten by the Philadelphia Athletics in the 1913 World Series.

Ace pitcher Christy Mathewson went 25–11 and led the NL with a 2.06 ERA. Rube Marquard and Jeff Tesreau also won over 20 games, and the Giants easily allowed the fewest runs of any team in the league.

Taken together with the 1911 and 1912 pennant winners, this team is considered one of the greatest of all-time. The roster was basically unchanged from 1912.

Regular season

Season standings

Record vs. opponents

Notable transactions 
 September 15, 1913: Rule 5 draft
Ben Dyer was drafted by the Giants from the Decatur Commodores.
Hank Ritter was drafted by the Giants from the Wilmington Chicks.

Roster

Player stats

Batting

Starters by position 
Note: Pos = Position; G = Games played; AB = At bats; H = Hits; Avg. = Batting average; HR = Home runs; RBI = Runs batted in

Other batters 
Note: G = Games played; AB = At bats; H = Hits; Avg. = Batting average; HR = Home runs; RBI = Runs batted in

Pitching

Starting pitchers 
Note: G = Games pitched; IP = Innings pitched; W = Wins; L = Losses; ERA = Earned run average; SO = Strikeouts

Other pitchers 
Note: G = Games pitched; IP = Innings pitched; W = Wins; L = Losses; ERA = Earned run average; SO = Strikeouts

Relief pitchers 
Note: G = Games pitched; W = Wins; L = Losses; SV = Saves; ERA = Earned run average; SO = Strikeouts

1913 World Series

Game 1 
October 7, 1913, at the Polo Grounds in New York City

Game 2 
October 8, 1913, at Shibe Park in Philadelphia

Game 3 
October 9, 1913, at the Polo Grounds in New York City

Game 4 
October 10, 1913, at Shibe Park in Philadelphia

Game 5 
October 11, 1913, at the Polo Grounds in New York City

References

External links
1913 New York Giants season at Baseball Reference

New York Giants (NL)
San Francisco Giants seasons
New York Giants season
National League champion seasons
New York G
1910s in Manhattan
Washington Heights, Manhattan